The First Power is a 1990 American neo-noir horror film written and directed by Robert Resnikoff, and starring Lou Diamond Phillips, Tracy Griffith, Jeff Kober and Mykelti Williamson.

The film received mostly negative reviews, but was a financial success.

Plot
A sadistic serial killer, Patrick Channing (Jeff Kober), known by most as the Pentagram Killer, is at large in Los Angeles, killing innocent people as a sacrifice to Satan. His specific MO is engraving a pentagram symbol into the flesh of his victims before killing them.

Detective Russell Logan (Lou Diamond Phillips) is determined to bring the Pentagram Killer to justice. He receives an anonymous phone call from a psychic called Tess Seaton (Tracy Griffith). After getting his promise that the man will not be executed, she tells him where the killer is going to strike next. With time running out for the next victim, Logan decides to take Tess on her word. Logan goes on a stakeout and successfully tracks down Channing's lair. During a struggle in which Logan apprehends Channing, Logan receives a severe stab wound to his torso.

Logan manages to recover from his stomach injury and breaks his word, and successfully seeks a death penalty sentence. Tess makes another phone call to Logan, pleading with him to keep his promise that Channing not be executed. Logan refuses, satisfied that Channing is now caught and cannot harm another person and, therefore, is not interested in sparing the serial killer from what he believes is a much-deserved fate. Channing is later convicted and sentenced to be executed in the gas chamber. However, since Channing was a worshipper of Satan, the latter seemingly grants Channing The First Power -- resurrection. This is the first of three special powers Channing is attempting to gain, and is directly stated in the film that Jesus Christ also possessed all three of these powers. Channing returns from the grave and is able to appear or disappear at will, as well as possess others. His main objective now becomes to get his revenge on Russell Logan as well as continue his work. Logan must then team up with Tess in order to find a way to defeat Channing once and for all. The climax of the film takes place at an unused part of a water treatment plant where Logan finds Tess after she was kidnapped from his apartment by Channing. Logan and Channing fight, while Channing is possessing a nun, resulting in Channing getting stabbed in the chest with a crucifix that has a knife hidden in it which is the only thing that will kill him. A police officer shoots and wounds Logan after he thought Logan was attacking a nun. Tess visits Logan in the hospital, where he wakes up and attacks her. She wakes up to realize that she was having another psychic vision of Channing possessing Logan, and she hears Channing's voice taunting her with the same line he used throughout the film to taunt Logan. This suggests that Channing's spirit is still free and roaming around.

Cast
 Lou Diamond Phillips as Detective Russell Logan
 Mykelti Williamson as Detective Oliver Franklin
 Elizabeth Arlen as Sister Marguerite
 Jeff Kober as Patrick Channing
 Dennis Lipscomb as Commander Perkns
 Carmen Argenziano as Lieutenant Al Grimes
 Clayton Landey as Detective Mazza
 Tracy Griffith as Tess Seaton
 Sue Giosa as Carmen
 Oz Tortora as Antonio
 Dan Tullis Jr. as Cop At Arrest
 Hansford Rowe as Father Brian
 Grand L. Bush as Reservoir Worker
 Bill Moseley as Bartender
 David Gale as Monsignor
 Philip Abbott as Cardinal
 J. Patrick McNamara as Priest
 Lynne Marta as Nun
 Brian Libby as Bum / Detective 
 Nada Despotovich as Bag Lady
 Juliana McCarthy as Mrs. Channing, Patrick's Grandmother
 Charles Raymond as Gang Member #1
 Scott Lawrence as Gang Member #2

Production
The movie began production under the title Transit.

Reception

The film received negative reviews, including Desson Howe's in the Washington Post, which called it "shopworn and imitative". In The New York Times, Vincent Canby wrote that Phillips "doesn't seem altogether comfortable here, but he certainly is not bad". He added that, despite the film's fast pace and impressive special effects, "the whole thing is seriously stupid".

As of November 2022, The First Power has a 25% "rotten" rating on Rotten Tomatoes from 12 reviews.

References

External links

 

1990 films
1990 crime thriller films
1990 horror films
1990s serial killer films
American neo-noir films
American serial killer films
Films about religion
American supernatural horror films
Orion Pictures films
Interscope Communications films
Films scored by Stewart Copeland
1990s English-language films
1990s American films